The 1997–98 season of Segunda División B of Spanish football started August 1997 and ended May 1998.

Summary before the 1997–98 season 
Playoffs de Ascenso:

 Sporting de Gijón B 
 Talavera
 Manchego
 Deportivo de La Coruña B
 Aurrerá
 Numancia (P) 
 Barakaldo
 Lemona
 Gimnàstic de Tarragona
 Elche (P) 
 Gramenet
 Figueres
 Córdoba
 Xerez (P) 
 Jaén (P) 
 Recreativo de Huelva

Relegated from Segunda División:

 Almería (dissolved)
 Real Madrid B
 Barcelona B
 Écija

Promoted from Tercera División:

 Caudal (from Group 2)
 Elgoibar (from Group 4)
 Amurrio (from Group 4)
 Ontinyent (from Group 6)
 Novelda (from Group 6)
 Leganés B (from Group 7)
 Burgos (from Group 8)
 Zamora (from Group 8)
 Motril (from Group 9)
 Isla Cristina (from Group 10)
 Sóller (from Group 11)
 Pájara Playas (from Group 12)
 Lorca (from Group 13)
 Moralo (from Group 14)
 Plasencia (from Group 14)
 Andorra (from Group 16)

Relegated:

 Aranjuez
 Moscardó
 Celta de Vigo B
 Marino de Luanco
 Real Sociedad B
 Zamudio
 Zalla
 Logroñés B
 Manlleu
 Benidorm
 Sant Andreu
 Llíria
 Ejido
 Vélez
 Realejos
 Marbella
 Huesca

Relegated by Real Madrid B relegation:
 Real Madrid C

Occupied the vacant spot by Real Madrid C relegation:
 Rayo Majadahonda (occupied the vacant spot of Real Madrid C)

Group I
Teams from Asturias, Castilla–La Mancha, Community of Madrid, Extremadura and Galicia.

Teams

League table

Results

Top goalscorers

Top goalkeepers

Group II
Teams from Aragon, Basque Country, Castile and León and Navarre.

Teams

League Table

Results

Top goalscorers

Top goalkeepers

Group III
Teams from Andorra, Balearic Islands, Canary Islands, Catalonia and Valencian Community.

Teams

League Table

Results

Top goalscorers

Top goalkeepers

Group IV
Teams from Andalusia, Castilla–La Mancha, Melilla and Region of Murcia.

Teams

League Table

Results

Top goalscorers

Top goalkeepers

Play-offs

Group A

Group B

Group C

Group D

Play-out

Semifinal

Final

External links
Futbolme.com

 
Segunda División B seasons
3

Spain